Confucianism, also known as Ruism or Ru classicism, is a system of thought and behavior originating in ancient China. Variously described as tradition, a philosophy, a religion, a humanistic or rationalistic religion, a way of governing, or a way of life. Confucianism developed from what was later called the Hundred Schools of Thought from the teachings of the Chinese philosopher Confucius (551–479 BCE).

Confucius considered himself a transmitter of cultural values inherited from the Xia (c. 2070–1600 BCE), Shang (c. 1600–1046 BCE) and Western Zhou dynasties (c. 1046–771 BCE). Confucianism was suppressed during the Legalist and autocratic Qin dynasty (221–206 BCE), but survived. During the Han dynasty (206 BCE–220 CE), Confucian approaches edged out the "proto-Taoist" Huang–Lao as the official ideology, while the emperors mixed both with the realist techniques of Legalism.

Confucianism regards texts such as the Five Classics as examples that should be followed to increase the harmony of the family, social order as a whole, and the world.

A Confucian revival began during the Tang dynasty (618–907 CE). In the late Tang, Confucianism developed in response to Buddhism and Taoism and was reformulated as Neo-Confucianism. This reinvigorated form was adopted as the basis of the imperial exams and the core philosophy of the scholar official class in the Song dynasty (960–1297). The abolition of the examination system in 1905 marked the end of official Confucianism. The intellectuals of the New Culture Movement of the early twentieth century blamed Confucianism for China's weaknesses. They searched for new doctrines to replace Confucian teachings; some of these new ideologies include the "Three Principles of the People" with the establishment of the Republic of China, and then Maoism under the People's Republic of China. In the late twentieth century, the Confucian work ethic has been credited with the rise of the East Asian economy.

With particular emphasis on the importance of the family and social harmony, rather than on an otherworldly source of spiritual values, the core of Confucianism is humanistic. According to American philosopher Herbert Fingarette's conceptualisation of Confucianism as a philosophical system which regards "the secular as sacred", Confucianism transcends the dichotomy between religion and humanism, considering the ordinary activities of human life—and especially human relationships—as a manifestation of the sacred, because they are the expression of humanity's moral nature (xìng ), which has a transcendent anchorage in Heaven (Tiān ). While Tiān has some characteristics that overlap the category of godhead, it is primarily an impersonal absolute principle, like the Dào or the Brahman. Confucianism focuses on the practical order that is given by a this-worldly awareness of the Tiān. Confucian liturgy (called  rú, or sometimes , meaning 'orthopraxy') led by Confucian priests or "sages of rites" to worship the gods in public and ancestral Chinese temples is preferred on certain occasions, by Confucian religious groups and for civil religious rites, over Taoist or popular ritual.

The worldly concern of Confucianism rests upon the belief that human beings are fundamentally good, and teachable, improvable, and perfectible through personal and communal endeavor, especially self-cultivation and self-creation. Confucian thought focuses on the cultivation of virtue in a morally organised world. Some of the basic Confucian ethical concepts and practices include rén, yì, and lǐ, and zhì. Rén ('benevolence' or 'humaneness') is the essence of the human being which manifests as compassion. It is the virtue-form of Heaven. Yì is the upholding of righteousness and the moral disposition to do good. Lǐ is a system of ritual norms and propriety that determines how a person should properly act in everyday life in harmony with the law of Heaven. Zhì is the ability to see what is right and fair, or the converse, in the behaviors exhibited by others. Confucianism holds one in contempt, either passively or actively, for failure to uphold the cardinal moral values of rén and yì.

Traditionally, cultures and countries in the East Asian cultural sphere are strongly influenced by Confucianism, including China, Taiwan, Korea, Japan, and Vietnam, as well as various territories settled predominantly by Han Chinese people, such as Singapore and Myanmar's Kokang. Today, it has been credited for shaping East Asian societies and overseas Chinese communities, and to some extent, other parts of Asia. Most Confucianist movements have had significant differences from the original Zhou-era teachings.

In the past few decades, there have been talks of a "Confucian Revival" in the academic and the scholarly community, and there has been a grassroots proliferation of various types of Confucian churches. In late 2015, many Confucian personalities formally established a national Confucian Church in China to unify the many Confucian congregations and civil society organisations.

Terminology

Strictly speaking, there is no term in Chinese which directly corresponds to "Confucianism". In the Chinese language, the character rú  meaning "scholar" or "learned" or "refined man" is generally used both in the past and the present to refer to things related to Confucianism. The character rú in ancient China had diverse meanings. Some examples include "to tame", "to mould", "to educate", "to refine". Several different terms, some of which with modern origin, are used in different situations to express different facets of Confucianism, including:
  – "ru school of thought";
  – "ru religion" in the sense of "ru doctrine";
  – "Ruology" or "ru learning";
  – "Confucius's doctrine";
  – "Kong family's business", a pejorative phrase used in the New Culture Movement and the Cultural Revolution.

Three of them use rú. These names do not use the name "Confucius" at all, but instead focus on the ideal of the Confucian man. The use of the term "Confucianism" has been avoided by some modern scholars, who favor "Ruism" and "Ruists" instead. Robert Eno argues that the term has been "burdened ... with the ambiguities and irrelevant traditional associations". Ruism, as he states, is more faithful to the original Chinese name for the school.

The term "Traditionalist" has been suggested by David Schaberg to emphasize the connection to the past, its standards, and inherited forms, in which Confucius himself placed so much importance. This translation of the word rú is followed by e.g. Yuri Pines.

According to Zhou Youguang,  rú originally referred to shamanic methods of holding rites and existed before Confucius's times, but with Confucius it came to mean devotion to propagating such teachings to bring civilisation to the people. Confucianism was initiated by the disciples of Confucius, developed by Mencius (c. 372–289 BCE) and inherited by later generations, undergoing constant transformations and restructuring since its establishment, but preserving the principles of humaneness and righteousness at its core.

Five Classics (Wǔjīng) and the Confucian vision

Traditionally, Confucius was thought to be the author or editor of the Five Classics which were the basic texts of Confucianism. The scholar Yao Xinzhong allows that there are good reasons to believe that Confucian classics took shape in the hands of Confucius, but that "nothing can be taken for granted in the matter of the early versions of the classics". Professor Yao says that perhaps most scholars today hold the "pragmatic" view that Confucius and his followers, although they did not intend to create a system of classics, "contributed to their formation".

The scholar Tu Weiming explains these classics as embodying "five visions" which underlie the development of Confucianism:
 I Ching or Classic of Change or Book of Changes, generally held to be the earliest of the classics, shows a metaphysical vision which combines divinatory art with numerological technique and ethical insight; philosophy of change sees cosmos as interaction between the two energies yin and yang; universe always shows organismic unity and dynamism.
 Classic of Poetry or Book of Songs is the earliest anthology of Chinese poems and songs. It shows the poetic vision in the belief that poetry and music convey common human feelings and mutual responsiveness.
 Book of Documents or Book of History Compilation of speeches of major figures and records of events in ancient times embodies the political vision and addresses the kingly way in terms of the ethical foundation for humane government. The documents show the sagacity, filial piety, and work ethic of Yao, Shun, and Yu. They established a political culture which was based on responsibility and trust. Their virtue formed a covenant of social harmony which did not depend on punishment or coercion.
 Book of Rites describes the social forms, administration, and ceremonial rites of the Zhou Dynasty. This social vision defined society not as an adversarial system based on contractual relations but as a community of trust based on social responsibility. The four functional occupations are cooperative (farmer, scholar, artisan, merchant).
 Spring and Autumn Annals chronicles the period to which it gives its name, Spring and Autumn period (771–476 BCE), from the perspective of Confucius's home state of Lu. These events emphasise the significance of collective memory for communal self-identification, for reanimating the old is the best way to attain the new.

Doctrines

Theory and theology

Confucianism revolves around the pursuit of the unity of the individual self and the God of Heaven (Tiān ), or, otherwise said, around the relationship between humanity and Heaven. The principle of Heaven (Lǐ  or Dào ), is the order of the creation and the source of divine authority, monistic in its structure. Individuals may realise their humanity and become one with Heaven through the contemplation of such order. This transformation of the self may be extended to the family and society to create a harmonious fiduciary community. Joël Thoraval studied Confucianism as a diffused civil religion in contemporary China, finding that it expresses itself in the widespread worship of five cosmological entities: Heaven and Earth (Di ), the sovereign or the government (jūn ), ancestors (qīn ) and masters (shī ).

According to the scholar Stephan Feuchtwang, in Chinese cosmology, which is not merely Confucian but shared by all Chinese religions, "the universe creates itself out of a primary chaos of material energy" (hundun  and qi ), organising through the polarity of yin and yang which characterises any thing and life. Creation is therefore a continuous ordering; it is not a creation ex nihilo. "Yin and yang are the invisible and visible, the receptive and the active, the unshaped and the shaped; they characterise the yearly cycle (winter and summer), the landscape (shady and bright), the sexes (female and male), and even sociopolitical history (disorder and order). Confucianism is concerned with finding "middle ways" between yin and yang at every new configuration of the world."

Confucianism conciliates both the inner and outer polarities of spiritual cultivation, that is to say self-cultivation and world redemption, synthesised in the ideal of "sageliness within and kingliness without". Rén, translated as "humaneness" or the essence proper of a human being, is the character of compassionate mind; it is the virtue endowed by Heaven and at the same time the means by which man may achieve oneness with Heaven comprehending his own origin in Heaven and therefore divine essence. In the Dàtóng shū it is defined as "to form one body with all things" and "when the self and others are not separated ... compassion is aroused".

Tiān and the gods

Tiān, a key concept in Chinese thought, refers to the God of Heaven, the northern culmen of the skies and its spinning stars, earthly nature and its laws which come from Heaven, to "Heaven and Earth" (that is, "all things"), and to the awe-inspiring forces beyond human control. There are such a number of uses in Chinese thought that it is not possible to give one translation into English.

Confucius used the term in a mystical way. He wrote in the Analects (7.23) that Tian gave him life, and that Tian watched and judged (6.28; 9.12). In 9.5 Confucius says that a person may know the movements of the Tian, and this provides with the sense of having a special place in the universe. In 17.19 Confucius says that Tian spoke to him, though not in words. The scholar Ronnie Littlejohn warns that Tian was not to be interpreted as a personal God comparable to that of the Abrahamic faiths, in the sense of an otherworldly or transcendent creator. Rather it is similar to what Taoists meant by Dao: "the way things are" or "the regularities of the world", which Stephan Feuchtwang equates with the ancient Greek concept of physis, "nature" as the generation and regenerations of things and of the moral order. Tian may also be compared to the Brahman of Hindu and Vedic traditions. The scholar Promise Hsu, in the wake of Robert B. Louden, explained 17:19 ("What does Tian ever say? Yet there are four seasons going round and there are the hundred things coming into being. What does Tian say?") as implying that even though Tian is not a "speaking person", it constantly "does" through the rhythms of nature, and communicates "how human beings ought to live and act", at least to those who have learnt to carefully listen to it.

Zigong, a disciple of Confucius, said that Tian had set the master on the path to become a wise man (9.6). In 7.23 Confucius says that he has no doubt left that the Tian gave him life, and from it he had developed right virtue ( dé). In 8.19 he says that the lives of the sages are interwoven with Tian.

Regarding personal gods (shén, energies who emanate from and reproduce the Tian) enliving nature, in the Analects Confucius says that it is appropriate for people to worship ( jìng) them, though through proper rites, implying respect of positions and discretion. Confucius himself was a ritual and sacrificial master. Answering to a disciple who asked whether it is better to sacrifice to the god of the stove or to the god of the family (a popular saying), in 3.13 Confucius says that in order to appropriately pray gods one should first know and respect Heaven. In 3.12 he explains that religious rituals produce meaningful experiences, and one has to offer sacrifices in person, acting in presence, otherwise "it is the same as not having sacrificed at all". Rites and sacrifices to the gods have an ethical importance: they generate good life, because taking part in them leads to the overcoming of the self. Analects 10.11 tells that Confucius always took a small part of his food and placed it on the sacrificial bowls as an offering to his ancestors.

Other movements, such as Mohism which was later absorbed by Taoism, developed a more theistic idea of Heaven. Feuchtwang explains that the difference between Confucianism and Taoism primarily lies in the fact that the former focuses on the realisation of the starry order of Heaven in human society, while the latter on the contemplation of the Dao which spontaneously arises in nature.

Social morality and ethics

As explained by Stephan Feuchtwang, the order coming from Heaven preserves the world, and has to be followed by humanity finding a "middle way" between yin and yang forces in each new configuration of reality. Social harmony or morality is identified as patriarchy, which is expressed in the worship of ancestors and deified progenitors in the male line, at ancestral shrines.

Confucian ethical codes are described as humanistic. They may be practiced by all the members of a society. Confucian ethics is characterised by the promotion of virtues, encompassed by the Five Constants, Wǔcháng in Chinese, elaborated by Confucian scholars out of the inherited tradition during the Han dynasty. The Five Constants are:
 Rén (benevolence, humaneness);
 Yì (righteousness, justice);
 Lǐ (propriety, rites);
 Zhì (wisdom, knowledge);
 Xìn (sincerity, faithfulness).

These are accompanied by the classical Sìzì, that singles out four virtues, one of which (Yì) is included among the Five Constants:
 Zhōng (loyalty);
 Xiào (filial piety);
 Jié (continence);
 Yì (righteousness).

There are still many other elements, such as chéng (honesty), shù (kindness and forgiveness), lián (honesty and cleanness), chǐ (shame, judge and sense of right and wrong), yǒng (bravery), wēn (kind and gentle), liáng (good, kindhearted), gōng (respectful, reverent), jiǎn (frugal), ràng (modestly, self-effacing).

Humaneness

Rén is the Confucian virtue denoting the good feeling a virtuous human experiences when being altruistic. It is exemplified by a normal adult's protective feelings for children. It is considered the essence of the human being, endowed by Heaven, and at the same time the means by which man may act according to the principle of Heaven (Tiān lǐ) and become one with it.

Yán Huí, Confucius's most outstanding student, once asked his master to describe the rules of rén and Confucius replied, "one should see nothing improper, hear nothing improper, say nothing improper, do nothing improper." Confucius also defined rén in the following way: "wishing to be established himself, seeks also to establish others; wishing to be enlarged himself, he seeks also to enlarge others."

Another meaning of rén is "not to do to others as you would not wish done to yourself." Confucius also said, "rén is not far off; he who seeks it has already found it." Rén is close to man and never leaves him.

Rite and centring

Li is a classical Chinese word which finds its most extensive use in Confucian and post-Confucian Chinese philosophy. Li is variously translated as "rite" or "reason," "ratio" in the pure sense of Vedic ṛta ("right," "order") when referring to the cosmic law, but when referring to its realisation in the context of human social behaviour it has also been translated as "customs", "measures" and "rules", among other terms. Li also means religious rites which establish relations between humanity and the gods.

According to Stephan Feuchtwang, rites are conceived as "what makes the invisible visible", making possible for humans to cultivate the underlying order of nature. Correctly performed rituals move society in alignment with earthly and heavenly (astral) forces, establishing the harmony of the three realms—Heaven, Earth and humanity. This practice is defined as "centring" ( yāng or  zhōng). Among all things of creation, humans themselves are "central" because they have the ability to cultivate and centre natural forces.

Li embodies the entire web of interaction between humanity, human objects, and nature. Confucius includes in his discussions of li such diverse topics as learning, tea drinking, titles, mourning, and governance. Xunzi cites "songs and laughter, weeping and lamentation... rice and millet, fish and meat... the wearing of ceremonial caps, embroidered robes, and patterned silks, or of fasting clothes and mourning clothes... spacious rooms and secluded halls, soft mats, couches and benches" as vital parts of the fabric of li.

Confucius envisioned proper government being guided by the principles of li. Some Confucians proposed that all human beings may pursue perfection by learning and practising li. Overall, Confucians believe that governments should place more emphasis on li and rely much less on penal punishment when they govern.

Loyalty
Loyalty (zhōng) is particularly relevant for the social class to which most of Confucius's students belonged, because the most important way for an ambitious young scholar to become a prominent official was to enter a ruler's civil service.

Confucius himself did not propose that "might makes right," but rather that a superior should be obeyed because of his moral rectitude. In addition, loyalty does not mean subservience to authority. This is because reciprocity is demanded from the superior as well. As Confucius stated "a prince should employ his minister according to the rules of propriety; ministers should serve their prince with faithfulness (loyalty)."

Similarly, Mencius also said that "when the prince regards his ministers as his hands and feet, his ministers regard their prince as their belly and heart; when he regards them as his dogs and horses, they regard him as another man; when he regards them as the ground or as grass, they regard him as a robber and an enemy." Moreover, Mencius indicated that if the ruler is incompetent, he should be replaced. If the ruler is evil, then the people have the right to overthrow him. A good Confucian is also expected to remonstrate with his superiors when necessary. At the same time, a proper Confucian ruler should also accept his ministers' advice, as this will help him govern the realm better.

In later ages, however, emphasis was often placed more on the obligations of the ruled to the ruler, and less on the ruler's obligations to the ruled. Like filial piety, loyalty was often subverted by the autocratic regimes in China. Nonetheless, throughout the ages, many Confucians continued to fight against unrighteous superiors and rulers. Many of these Confucians suffered and sometimes died because of their conviction and action. During the Ming-Qing era, prominent Confucians such as Wang Yangming promoted individuality and independent thinking as a counterweight to subservience to authority. The famous thinker Huang Zongxi also strongly criticised the autocratic nature of the imperial system and wanted to keep imperial power in check.

Many Confucians also realised that loyalty and filial piety have the potential of coming into conflict with one another. This may be true especially in times of social chaos, such as during the period of the Ming-Qing transition.

Filial piety

In Confucian philosophy, filial piety (xiào) is a virtue of respect for one's parents and ancestors, and of the hierarchies within society: father–son, elder–junior and male–female. The Confucian classic Xiaojing ("Book of Piety"), thought to be written around the Qin-Han period, has historically been the authoritative source on the Confucian tenet of xiào. The book, a conversation between Confucius and his disciple Zeng Shen, is about how to set up a good society using the principle of xiào.

In more general terms, filial piety means to be good to one's parents; to take care of one's parents; to engage in good conduct not just towards parents but also outside the home so as to bring a good name to one's parents and ancestors; to perform the duties of one's job well so as to obtain the material means to support parents as well as carry out sacrifices to the ancestors; not be rebellious; show love, respect and support; the wife in filial piety must obey her husband absolutely and take care of the whole family wholeheartedly. display courtesy; ensure male heirs, uphold fraternity among brothers; wisely advise one's parents, including dissuading them from moral unrighteousness, for blindly following the parents' wishes is not considered to be xiao; display sorrow for their sickness and death; and carry out sacrifices after their death.

Filial piety is considered a key virtue in Chinese culture, and it is the main concern of a large number of stories. One of the most famous collections of such stories is "The Twenty-four Filial Exemplars". These stories depict how children exercised their filial piety in the past. While China has always had a diversity of religious beliefs, filial piety has been common to almost all of them; historian Hugh D.R. Baker calls respect for the family the only element common to almost all Chinese believers.

Relationships
Social harmony results in part from every individual knowing his or her place in the natural order, and playing his or her part well. Reciprocity or responsibility (renqing) extends beyond filial piety and involves the entire network of social relations, even the respect for rulers. This is shown in the story where Duke Jing of Qi asks Confucius about government, by which he meant proper administration so as to bring social harmony.

Particular duties arise from one's particular situation in relation to others. The individual stands simultaneously in several different relationships with different people: as a junior in relation to parents and elders, and as a senior in relation to younger siblings, students, and others. While juniors are considered in Confucianism to owe their seniors reverence, seniors also have duties of benevolence and concern toward juniors. The same is true with the husband and wife relationship where the husband needs to show benevolence towards his wife and the wife needs to respect the husband in return. This theme of mutuality still exists in East Asian cultures even to this day.

The Five Bonds are: ruler to ruled, father to son, husband to wife, elder brother to younger brother, friend to friend. Specific duties were prescribed to each of the participants in these sets of relationships. Such duties are also extended to the dead, where the living stand as sons to their deceased family. The only relationship where respect for elders isn't stressed was the friend to friend relationship, where mutual equal respect is emphasised instead. All these duties take the practical form of prescribed rituals, for instance wedding and death rituals.

Junzi

The junzi (jūnzǐ, "lord's son") is a Chinese philosophical term often translated as "gentleman" or "superior person" and employed by Confucius in the Analects to describe the ideal man.

In Confucianism, the sage or wise is the ideal personality; however, it is very hard to become one of them. Confucius created the model of junzi, gentleman, which may be achieved by any individual. Later, Zhu Xi defined junzi as second only to the sage. There are many characteristics of the junzi: he may live in poverty, he does more and speaks less, he is loyal, obedient and knowledgeable. The junzi disciplines himself. Ren is fundamental to become a junzi.

As the potential leader of a nation, a son of the ruler is raised to have a superior ethical and moral position while gaining inner peace through his virtue. To Confucius, the junzi sustained the functions of government and social stratification through his ethical values. Despite its literal meaning, any righteous man willing to improve himself may become a junzi.

On the contrary, the xiaoren (xiăorén, "small or petty person") does not grasp the value of virtues and seeks only immediate gains. The petty person is egotistic and does not consider the consequences of his action in the overall scheme of things. Should the ruler be surrounded by xiaoren as opposed to junzi, his governance and his people will suffer due to their small-mindness. Examples of such xiaoren individuals may range from those who continually indulge in sensual and emotional pleasures all day to the politician who is interested merely in power and fame; neither sincerely aims for the long-term benefit of others.

The junzi enforces his rule over his subjects by acting virtuously himself. It is thought that his pure virtue would lead others to follow his example. The ultimate goal is that the government behaves much like a family, the junzi being a beacon of filial piety.

Rectification of names

Confucius believed that social disorder often stemmed from failure to perceive, understand, and deal with reality. Fundamentally, then, social disorder may stem from the failure to call things by their proper names, and his solution to this was zhèngmíng. He gave an explanation of zhengming to one of his disciples.

Zi-lu said, "The vassal of Wei has been waiting for you, in order with you to administer the government. What will you consider the first thing to be done?"
The Master replied, "What is necessary to rectify names."
"So! indeed!" said Zi-lu. "You are wide off the mark! Why must there be such rectification?"
The Master said, "How uncultivated you are, Yu! The superior man [Junzi] cannot care about the everything, just as he cannot go to check all himself!
        If names be not correct, language is not in accordance with the truth of things.
        If language be not in accordance with the truth of things, affairs cannot be carried on to success.
        When affairs cannot be carried on to success, proprieties and music do not flourish.
        When proprieties and music do not flourish, punishments will not be properly awarded.
        When punishments are not properly awarded, the people do not know how to move hand or foot.
Therefore a superior man considers it necessary that the names he uses may be spoken appropriately, and also that what he speaks may be carried out appropriately. What the superior man requires is just that in his words there may be nothing incorrect."
(Analects XIII, 3, tr. Legge)

Xun Zi chapter (22) "On the Rectification of Names" claims the ancient sage-kings chose names that directly corresponded with actualities, but later generations confused terminology, coined new nomenclature, and thus could no longer distinguish right from wrong. Since social harmony is of utmost importance, without the proper rectification of names, society would essentially crumble and "undertakings [would] not [be] completed."

History

According to He Guanghu, Confucianism may be identified as a continuation of the Shang-Zhou (~1600–256 BCE) official religion, or the Chinese aboriginal religion which has lasted uninterrupted for three thousand years. Both the dynasties worshipped the supreme godhead, called Shangdi ( "Highest Deity") or Dì by the Shang and Tian ( "Heaven") by the Zhou. Shangdi was conceived as the first ancestor of the Shang royal house, an alternate name for him being the "Supreme Progenitor" ( Shàngjiǎ). In Shang theology, the multiplicity of gods of nature and ancestors were viewed as parts of Di, and the four  fāng ("directions" or "sides") and their  fēng ("winds") as his cosmic will. With the Zhou dynasty, which overthrew the Shang, the name for the supreme godhead became Tian ( "Heaven"). While the Shang identified Shangdi as their ancestor-god to assert their claim to power by divine right, the Zhou transformed this claim into a legitimacy based on moral power, the Mandate of Heaven. In Zhou theology, Tian had no singular earthly progeny, but bestowed divine favour on virtuous rulers. Zhou kings declared that their victory over the Shang was because they were virtuous and loved their people, while the Shang were tyrants and thus were deprived of power by Tian.

John C. Didier and David Pankenier relate the shapes of both the ancient Chinese characters for Di and Tian to the patterns of stars in the northern skies, either drawn, in Didier's theory by connecting the constellations bracketing the north celestial pole as a square, or in Pankenier's theory by connecting some of the stars which form the constellations of the Big Dipper and broader Ursa Major, and Ursa Minor (Little Dipper). Cultures in other parts of the world have also conceived these stars or constellations as symbols of the origin of things, the supreme godhead, divinity and royal power. The supreme godhead was also identified with the dragon, symbol of unlimited power (qi), of the "protean" primordial power which embodies both yin and yang in unity, associated to the constellation Draco which winds around the north ecliptic pole, and slithers between the Little and Big Dipper.

By the 6th century BCE the power of Tian and the symbols that represented it on earth (architecture of cities, temples, altars and ritual cauldrons, and the Zhou ritual system) became "diffuse" and claimed by different potentates in the Zhou states to legitimise economic, political, and military ambitions. Divine right no longer was an exclusive privilege of the Zhou royal house, but might be bought by anyone able to afford the elaborate ceremonies and the old and new rites required to access the authority of Tian.

Besides the waning Zhou ritual system, what may be defined as "wild" ( yě) traditions, or traditions "outside of the official system", developed as attempts to access the will of Tian. The population had lost faith in the official tradition, which was no longer perceived as an effective way to communicate with Heaven. Chinese thinkers, faced with this challenge to legitimacy, diverged in a "Hundred Schools of Thought", each proposing its own theories for the reconstruction of the Zhou moral order.

Confucius (551–479 BCE) appeared in this period of political decadence and spiritual questioning. He was educated in Shang-Zhou theology, which he contributed to transmit and reformulate giving centrality to self-cultivation and agency of humans, and the educational power of the self-established individual in assisting others to establish themselves (the principle of  àirén, "loving others"). As the Zhou reign collapsed, traditional values were abandoned resulting in a period of perceived moral decline. Confucius saw an opportunity to reinforce values of compassion and tradition into society. Disillusioned with the culture, opposing scholars, and religious authorities of the time, he began to preach an ethical interpretation of traditional Zhou religion. In his view, the power of Tian is immanent, and responds positively to the sincere heart driven by humaneness and rightness, decency and altruism. Confucius conceived these qualities as the foundation needed to restore socio-political harmony. Like many contemporaries, Confucius saw ritual practices as efficacious ways to access Tian, but he thought that the crucial knot was the state of meditation that participants enter prior to engage in the ritual acts. Confucius amended and recodified the classical books inherited from the Xia-Shang-Zhou dynasties, and composed the Spring and Autumn Annals.

Philosophers in the Warring States period, both "inside the square" (focused on state-endorsed ritual) and "outside the square" (non-aligned to state ritual) built upon Confucius's legacy, compiled in the Analects, and formulated the classical metaphysics that became the lash of Confucianism. In accordance with the Master, they identified mental tranquility as the state of Tian, or the One (一 Yī), which in each individual is the Heaven-bestowed divine power to rule one's own life and the world. Going beyond the Master, they theorised the oneness of production and reabsorption into the cosmic source, and the possibility to understand and therefore reattain it through meditation. This line of thought would have influenced all Chinese individual and collective-political mystical theories and practices thereafter.

Organisation and liturgy

Since the 2000s, there has been a growing identification of the Chinese intellectual class with Confucianism. In 2003, the Confucian intellectual Kang Xiaoguang published a manifesto in which he made four suggestions: Confucian education should enter official education at any level, from elementary to high school; the state should establish Confucianism as the state religion by law; Confucian religion should enter the daily life of ordinary people through standardisation and development of doctrines, rituals, organisations, churches and activity sites; the Confucian religion should be spread through non-governmental organisations. Another modern proponent of the institutionalisation of Confucianism in a state church is Jiang Qing.

In 2005, the Center for the Study of Confucian Religion was established, and guoxue started to be implemented in public schools on all levels. Being well received by the population, even Confucian preachers have appeared on television since 2006. The most enthusiastic New Confucians proclaim the uniqueness and superiority of Confucian Chinese culture, and have generated some popular sentiment against Western cultural influences in China.

The idea of a "Confucian Church" as the state religion of China has roots in the thought of Kang Youwei, an exponent of the early New Confucian search for a regeneration of the social relevance of Confucianism, at a time when it was de-institutionalised with the collapse of the Qing dynasty and the Chinese empire. Kang modeled his ideal "Confucian Church" after European national Christian churches, as a hierarchic and centralised institution, closely bound to the state, with local church branches, devoted to the worship and the spread of the teachings of Confucius.

In contemporary China, the Confucian revival has developed into various interwoven directions: the proliferation of Confucian schools or academies (shuyuan ), the resurgence of Confucian rites (chuántǒng lǐyí ), and the birth of new forms of Confucian activity on the popular level, such as the Confucian communities (shèqū rúxué ). Some scholars also consider the reconstruction of lineage churches and their ancestral temples, as well as cults and temples of natural and national gods within broader Chinese traditional religion, as part of the renewal of Confucianism.

Other forms of revival are salvationist folk religious movements groups with a specifically Confucian focus, or Confucian churches, for example the Yidan xuetang of Beijing, the Mengmutang of Shanghai, Confucian Shenism ( Rúzōng Shénjiào) or the phoenix churches, the Confucian Fellowship ( Rújiào Dàotán) in northern Fujian which has spread rapidly over the years after its foundation, and ancestral temples of the Kong kin (the lineage of the descendants of Confucius himself) operating as Confucian-teaching churches.

Also, the Hong Kong Confucian Academy, one of the direct heirs of Kang Youwei's Confucian Church, has expanded its activities to the mainland, with the construction of statues of Confucius, Confucian hospitals, restoration of temples and other activities. In 2009, Zhou Beichen founded another institution which inherits the idea of Kang Youwei's Confucian Church, the Holy Hall of Confucius ( Kǒngshèngtáng) in Shenzhen, affiliated with the Federation of Confucian Culture of Qufu City. It was the first of a nationwide movement of congregations and civil organisations that was unified in 2015 in the Church of Confucius ( Kǒngshènghuì). The first spiritual leader of the church is the scholar Jiang Qing, the founder and manager of the Yangming Confucian Abode ( Yángmíng jīngshě), a Confucian academy in Guiyang, Guizhou.

Chinese folk religious temples and kinship ancestral shrines may, on peculiar occasions, choose Confucian liturgy (called  rú or  zhèngtǒng, "orthopraxy") led by Confucian ritual masters ( lǐshēng) to worship the gods, instead of Taoist or popular ritual. "Confucian businessmen" ( rúshāngrén, also "refined businessman") is a recently rediscovered concept defining people of the economic-entrepreneurial elite who recognise their social responsibility and therefore apply Confucian culture to their business.

Confucianists historically tried to proselytize to others, although this is rarely done in modern times. They also fought wars to enforce the belief system on others and enforce specific versions of it, possibly some of the first in religious history done by factions who believed only a single divine being was the primary force driving the world.

Governance

A key Confucian concept is that in order to govern others one must first govern oneself according to the universal order. When actual, the king's personal virtue (de) spreads beneficent influence throughout the kingdom. This idea is developed further in the Great Learning, and is tightly linked with the Taoist concept of wu wei: the less the king does, the more gets done. By being the "calm center" around which the kingdom turns, the king allows everything to function smoothly and avoids having to tamper with the individual parts of the whole.

This idea may be traced back to the ancient shamanic beliefs of the king being the axle between the sky, human beings, and the Earth. The emperors of China were considered agents of Heaven, endowed with the Mandate of Heaven. They hold the power to define the hierarchy of divinities, by bestowing titles upon mountains, rivers and dead people, acknowledging them as powerful and therefore establishing their cults.

Confucianism, despite supporting the importance of obeying national authority, places this obedience under absolute moral principles that curbed the willful exercise of power, rather than being unconditional. Submission to authority (tsun wang) was only taken within the context of the moral obligations that rulers had toward their subjects, in particular benevolence (jen). Confucianism — including the most pro-authoritarian scholars such as Xunzi — has always recognised the Right of revolution against tyranny.

Meritocracy

Although Confucius claimed that he never invented anything but was only transmitting ancient knowledge (Analects 7.1), he did produce a number of new ideas. Many European and American admirers such as Voltaire and Herrlee G. Creel point to the revolutionary idea of replacing nobility of blood with nobility of virtue. Jūnzǐ (君子, lit. "lord's son"), which originally signified the younger, non-inheriting, offspring of a noble, became, in Confucius's work, an epithet having much the same meaning and evolution as the English "gentleman."

A virtuous commoner who cultivates his qualities may be a "gentleman", while a shameless son of the king is only a "petty person". That Confucius admitted students of different classes as disciples is a clear demonstration that he fought against the feudal structures that defined pre-imperial Chinese society.

Another new idea, that of meritocracy, led to the introduction of the imperial examination system in China. This system allowed anyone who passed an examination to become a government officer, a position which would bring wealth and honour to the whole family. The Chinese imperial examination system started in the Sui dynasty. Over the following centuries the system grew until finally almost anyone who wished to become an official had to prove his worth by passing a set of written government examinations.

Confucian political meritocracy is not merely a historical phenomenon. The practice of meritocracy still exists across China and East Asia today, and a wide range of contemporary intellectuals — from Daniel Bell to Tongdong Bai, Joseph Chan, and Jiang Qing — defend political meritocracy as a viable alternative to liberal democracy.

In Just Hierarchy, Daniel Bell and Wang Pei argue that hierarchies are inevitable. Faced with ever-increasing complexity at scale, modern societies must build hierarchies to coordinate collective action and tackle long-term problems such as climate change. In this context, people need not — and should not — want to flatten hierarchies as much as possible. They ought to ask what makes political hierarchies just and use these criteria to decide the institutions that deserve preservation, those that require reform, and those that need radical transformation. They call this approach "progressive conservatism", a term that reflects the ambiguous place of the Confucian tradition within the Left-Right dichotomy.

Bell and Wang propose two justifications for political hierarchies that do not depend on a "one person, one vote" system. First is raw efficiency, which may require centralized rule in the hands of the competent few. Second, and most important, is serving the interests of the people (and the common good more broadly). In Against Political Equality, Tongdong Bai complements this account by using a proto-Rawlsian "political difference principle". Just as Rawls claims that economic inequality is justified so long as it benefits those at the bottom of the socioeconomic ladder, so Bai argues that political inequality is justified so long as it benefits those materially worse off.

Bell, Wang, and Bai all criticize liberal democracy to argue that government by the people may not be government for the people in any meaningful sense of the term. They argue that voters tend to act in irrational, tribal, short-termist ways; they are vulnerable to populism and struggle to account for the interests of future generations. In other words, at a minimum, democracy needs Confucian meritocratic checks.

In The China Model, Bell argues that Confucian political meritocracy provides—and has provided—a blueprint for China's development. For Bell, the ideal according to which China should reform itself (and has reformed itself) follows a simple structure: Aspiring rulers first pass hyper-selective examinations, then have to rule well at the local level to be promoted to positions as the provincial level, then have to excel at the provincial level to access positions at the national level, and so on. This system aligns with what Harvard historian James Hankins calls "virtue politics", or the idea that institutions should be built to select the most competent and virtuous rulers — as opposed to institutions concerned first and foremost with limiting the power of rulers.

While contemporary defenders of Confucian political meritocracy all accept this broad frame, they disagree with each other on three main questions: institutional design, the means by which meritocrats are promoted, and the compatibility of Confucian political meritocracy with liberalism.

Institutional design

Bell and Wang favour a system in which officials at the local level are democratically elected and higher-level officials are promoted by peers. As Bell puts it, he defends "democracy at the bottom, experimentation in the middle, and meritocracy at the top." Bell and Wang argue that this combination conserves the main advantages of democracy — involving the people in public affairs at the local level, strengthening the legitimacy of the system, forcing some degree of direct accountability, etc. — while preserving the broader meritocratic character of the regime.

Jiang Qing, by contrast, imagines a tricameral government with one chamber selected by the people (the House of the Commoners 庶民院), one chamber composed of Confucian meritocrats selected via examination and gradual promotion (the House of Confucian Tradition 通儒院), and one body made up of descendants of Confucius himself (The House of National Essence 国体院). Jiang's aim is to construct a legitimacy that will go beyond what he sees as the atomistic, individualist, and utilitarian ethos of modern democracies and ground authority in something sacred and traditional. While Jiang's model is closer to an ideal theory than Bell's proposals, it represents a more traditionalist alternative.

Tongdong Bai presents an in-between solution by proposing a two-tiered bicameral system. At the local level, as with Bell, Bai advocates Deweyan participatory democracy. At the national level, Bai proposes two chambers: one of meritocrats (selected by examination, by examination and promotion, from leaders in certain professional fields, etc.), and one of representatives elected by the people. While the lower house does not have any legislative power per se, it acts as a popular accountability mechanism by championing the people and putting pressure on the upper house. More generally, Bai argues that his model marries the best of meritocracy and democracy. Following Dewey's account of democracy as a way of life, he points to the participatory features of his local model: citizens still get to have a democratic lifestyle, participate in political affairs, and be educated as "democratic men". Similarly, the lower house allows citizens to be represented, have a voice in public affairs (albeit a weak one), and ensure accountability. Meanwhile, the meritocratic house preserves competence, statesmanship, and Confucian virtues.

Promotion system

Defenders of Confucian political meritocracy all champion a system in which rulers are selected on the basis of intellect, social skills, and virtue. Bell proposes a model wherein aspiring meritocrats take hyper-selective exams and prove themselves at the local levels of government before reaching the higher levels of government, where they hold more centralized power. In his account, the exams select for intellect and other virtues — for instance, the ability to argue three different viewpoints on a contentious issue may indicate a certain degree of openness. Tongdong Bai's approach incorporates different ways to select members of the meritocratic house, from exams to performance in various fields — business, science, administration, and so on. In every case, Confucian meritocrats draw on China's extensive history of meritocratic administration to outline the pros and cons of competing methods of selection.

For those who, like Bell, defend a model in which performance at the local levels of government determines future promotion, an important question is how the system judges who "performs best". In other words, while examinations may ensure that early-career officials are competent and educated, how is it thereafter ensured that only those who rule well get promoted? The literature opposes those who prefer evaluation by peers to evaluation by superiors, with some thinkers including quasi-democratic selection mechanisms along the way. Bell and Wang favour a system in which officials at the local level are democratically elected and higher-level officials are promoted by peers. Because they believe that promotion should depend upon peer evaluations only, Bell and Wang argue against transparency — i.e. the public should not know how officials are selected, since ordinary people are in no position to judge officials beyond the local level. Others, like Jiang Qing, defend a model in which superiors decide who gets promoted; this method is in line with more traditionalist strands of Confucian political thought, which place a greater emphasis on strict hierarchies and epistemic paternalism — that is, the idea that older and more experienced people know more.

Compatibility with liberalism and democracy, and critique of political meritocracy

Another key question is whether Confucian political thought is compatible with liberalism. Tongdong Bai, for instance, argues that while Confucian political thought departs from the "one person, one vote" model, it can conserve many of the essential characteristics of liberalism, such as freedom of speech and individual rights. In fact, both Daniel Bell and Tongdong Bai hold that Confucian political meritocracy can tackle challenges that liberalism wants to tackle, but cannot by itself. At the cultural level, for instance, Confucianism, its institutions, and its rituals offer bulwarks against atomization and individualism. At the political level, the non-democratic side of political meritocracy is — for Bell and Bai — more efficient at addressing long-term questions such as climate change, in part because the meritocrats do not have to worry about the whims of public opinion.

Joseph Chan defends the compatibility of Confucianism with both liberalism and democracy. In his book Confucian Perfectionism, he argues that Confucians can embrace both democracy and liberalism on instrumental grounds; that is, while liberal democracy may not be valuable for its own sake, its institutions remains valuable — particularly when combined with a broadly Confucian culture — to serve Confucian ends and inculcate Confucian virtues.

Other Confucians have criticized Confucian meritocrats like Bell for their rejection of democracy. For them, Confucianism does not have to be premised on the assumption that meritorious, virtuous political leadership is inherently incompatible with popular sovereignty, political equality and the right to political participation. These thinkers accuse the meritocrats of overestimating the flaws of democracy, mistaking temporary flaws for permanent and inherent features, and underestimating the challenges that the construction of a true political meritocracy poses in practice — including those faced by contemporary China and Singapore. Franz Mang claims that, when decoupled from democracy, meritocracy tends to deteriorate into an oppressive regime under putatively "meritorious" but actually "authoritarian" rulers; Mang accuses Bell's China model of being self-defeating, as — Mang claims — the CCP's authoritarian modes of engagement with the dissenting voices illustrate. Baogang He and Mark Warren add that "meritocracy" should be understood as a concept describing a regime's character rather than its type, which is determined by distribution of political power — on their view, democratic institutions can be built which are meritocratic insofar as they favour competence.

Roy Tseng, drawing on the New Confucians of the twentieth century, argues that Confucianism and liberal democracy can enter into a dialectical process, in which liberal rights and voting rights are rethought into resolutely modern, but nonetheless Confucian ways of life. This synthesis, blending Confucians rituals and institutions with a broader liberal democratic frame, is distinct from both Western-style liberalism — which, for Tseng, suffers from excessive individualism and a lack of moral vision — and from traditional Confucianism — which, for Tseng, has historically suffered from rigid hierarchies and sclerotic elites. Against defenders of political meritocracy, Tseng claims that the fusion of Confucian and democratic institutions can conserve the best of both worlds, producing a more communal democracy which draws on a rich ethical tradition, addresses abuses of power, and combines popular accountability with a clear attention to the cultivation of virtue in elites.

Influence

In 17th-century Europe

The works of Confucius were translated into European languages through the agency of Jesuit missionaries stationed in China. Matteo Ricci was among the very earliest to report on the thoughts of Confucius, and father Prospero Intorcetta wrote about the life and works of Confucius in Latin in 1687.

Translations of Confucian texts influenced European thinkers of the period, particularly among the Deists and other philosophical groups of the Enlightenment who were interested by the integration of the system of morality of Confucius into Western civilization.

Confucianism influenced the German philosopher Gottfried Wilhelm Leibniz, who was attracted to the philosophy because of its perceived similarity to his own. It is postulated that certain elements of Leibniz's philosophy, such as "simple substance" and "Pre-established harmony," were borrowed from his interactions with Confucianism. 

The French philosopher Voltaire, Leibniz's intellectual rival, was also influenced by Confucius, seeing the concept of Confucian rationalism as an alternative to Christian dogma. He praised Confucian ethics and politics, portraying the sociopolitical hierarchy of China as a model for Europe.

On Islamic thought
From the late 17th century onwards a whole body of literature known as the Han Kitab developed amongst the Hui Muslims of China who infused Islamic thought with Confucianism. Especially the works of Liu Zhi such as Tiānfāng Diǎnlǐ sought to harmonise Islam with not only Confucianism but also with Taoism and is considered to be one of the crowning achievements of the Chinese Islamic culture.

In modern times
Important military and political figures in modern Chinese history continued to be influenced by Confucianism, like the Muslim warlord Ma Fuxiang. The New Life Movement in the early 20th century was also influenced by Confucianism.

Referred to variously as the Confucian hypothesis and as a debated component of the more all-encompassing Asian Development Model, there exists among political scientists and economists a theory that Confucianism plays a large latent role in the ostensibly non-Confucian cultures of modern-day East Asia, in the form of the rigorous work ethic it endowed those cultures with. These scholars have held that, if not for Confucianism's influence on these cultures, many of the people of the East Asia region would not have been able to modernise and industrialise as quickly as Singapore, Malaysia, Hong Kong, Taiwan, Japan, South Korea and even China have done.

For example, the impact of the Vietnam War on Vietnam was devastating, but over the last few decades Vietnam has been re-developing in a very fast pace. Most scholars attribute the origins of this idea to futurologist Herman Kahn's World Economic Development: 1979 and Beyond.

Other studies, for example Cristobal Kay's Why East Asia Overtook Latin America: Agrarian Reform, Industrialization, and Development, have attributed the Asian growth to other factors, for example the character of agrarian reforms, "state-craft" (state capacity), and interaction between agriculture and industry.

On Chinese martial arts
After Confucianism had become the official 'state religion' in China, its influence penetrated all walks of life and all streams of thought in Chinese society for the generations to come. This did not exclude martial arts culture. Though in his own day, Confucius had rejected the practice of Martial Arts (with the exception of Archery), he did serve under rulers who used military power extensively to achieve their goals. In later centuries, Confucianism heavily influenced many educated martial artists of great influence, such as Sun Lutang, especially from the 19th century onwards, when bare-handed martial arts in China became more widespread and had begun to more readily absorb philosophical influences from Confucianism, Buddhism and Daoism. Some argue therefore that despite Confucius's disdain with martial culture, his teachings became of much relevance to it.

Criticism

Confucius and Confucianism were opposed or criticised from the start, including Laozi's philosophy and Mozi's critique, and Legalists such as Han Fei ridiculed the idea that virtue would lead people to be orderly. In modern times, waves of opposition and vilification showed that Confucianism, instead of taking credit for the glories of Chinese civilisation, now had to take blame for its failures. The Taiping Rebellion described Confucianism sages as well as gods in Taoism and Buddhism as devils.

Contradiction with modernist values 

In the New Culture Movement, Lu Xun criticised Confucianism for shaping Chinese people into the condition they had reached by the late Qing dynasty: his criticisms are expressed metaphorically in the work "Diary of a Madman", in which traditional Chinese Confucian society is portrayed as feudalistic, hypocritical, socially cannibalistic, despotic, fostering a "slave mentality" favouring despotism, lack of critical thinking and blind obedience and worship of authority, fuelling a form of "Confucian authoritarianism" which persists into the present day. Leftists during the Cultural Revolution described Confucius as the representative of the class of slave owners.

In South Korea, there has long been criticism. Some South Koreans believe Confucianism has not contributed to the modernisation of South Korea. For example, South Korean writer Kim Kyong-il wrote an essay  entitled "Confucius Must Die For the Nation to Live" (gongjaga jug-eoya naraga sanda). Kim said that filial piety is one-sided and blind, and if it continues, social problems will continue as government keeps forcing Confucian filial obligations onto families.

Women in Confucian thought

Confucianism "largely defined the mainstream discourse on gender in China from the Han dynasty onward." The gender roles prescribed in the Three Obediences and Four Virtues became a cornerstone of the family, and thus, societal stability. The Three Obediences and Four Virtues is one of the moral standards for feudal etiquette to bind women. Starting from the Han period, Confucians began to teach that a virtuous woman was supposed to follow the males in her family: the father before her marriage, the husband after she marries, and her sons in widowhood. In the later dynasties, more emphasis was placed on the virtue of chastity. The Song dynasty Confucian Cheng Yi stated that: "To starve to death is a small matter, but to lose one's chastity is a great matter." Chaste widows were revered and memorialised during the Ming and Qing periods. This "cult of chastity" accordingly condemned many widows to poverty and loneliness by placing a social stigma on remarriage.

For years, many modern scholars have regarded Confucianism as a sexist, patriarchal ideology that was historically damaging to Chinese women. It has also been argued by some Chinese and Western writers that the rise of neo-Confucianism during the Song dynasty had led to a decline of status of women. Some critics have also accused the prominent Song neo-Confucian scholar Zhu Xi for believing in the inferiority of women and that men and women need to be kept strictly separate, while Sima Guang also believed that women should remain indoors and not deal with the matters of men in the outside world. Finally, scholars have discussed the attitudes toward women in Confucian texts such as Analects. In a much-discussed passage, women are grouped together with xiaoren (literally "small people", meaning people of low status or low moral) and described as being difficult to cultivate or deal with. Many traditional commentators and modern scholars have debated over the precise meaning of the passage, and whether Confucius referred to all women or just certain groups of women.

Further analysis suggests, however, that women's place in Confucian society may be more complex. During the Han dynasty period, the influential Confucian text Lessons for Women (Nüjie), was written by Ban Zhao (45–114 CE) to instruct her daughters how to be proper Confucian wives and mothers, that is, to be silent, hard-working, and compliant. She stresses the complementarity and equal importance of the male and female roles according to yin-yang theory, but she clearly accepts the dominance of the male. However, she does present education and literary power as important for women. In later dynasties, a number of women took advantage of the Confucian acknowledgment of education to become independent in thought.

Joseph A. Adler points out that "Neo-Confucian writings do not necessarily reflect either the prevailing social practices or the scholars' own attitudes and practices in regard to actual women." Matthew Sommers has also indicated that the Qing dynasty government began to realise the utopian nature of enforcing the "cult of chastity" and began to allow practices such as widow remarrying to stand. Moreover, some Confucian texts like the Chunqiu Fanlu  have passages that suggest a more equal relationship between a husband and his wife. More recently, some scholars have also begun to discuss the viability of constructing a "Confucian feminism".

Catholic controversy over Chinese rites

Ever since Europeans first encountered Confucianism, the issue of how Confucianism should be classified has been subject to debate. In the 16th and the 17th centuries, the earliest European arrivals in China, the Christian Jesuits, considered Confucianism to be an ethical system, not a religion, and one that was compatible with Christianity. The Jesuits, including Matteo Ricci, saw Chinese rituals as "civil rituals" that could co-exist alongside the spiritual rituals of Catholicism.

By the early 18th century, this initial portrayal was rejected by the Dominicans and Franciscans, creating a dispute among Catholics in East Asia that was known as the "Rites Controversy." The Dominicans and Franciscans argued that Chinese ancestral worship was a form of idolatry that was contradictory to the tenets of Christianity. This view was reinforced by Pope Benedict XIV, who ordered a ban on Chinese rituals, though this ban was re-assessed and repealed in 1939 by Pope Pius XII, provided that such traditions harmonize with the true and authentic spirit of the liturgy.

Some critics view Confucianism as definitely pantheistic and nontheistic, in that it is not based on the belief in the supernatural or in a personal god existing separate from the temporal plane. Confucius views about Tiān 天 and about the divine providence ruling the world, can be found above (in this page) and in Analects 6:26, 7:22, and 9:12, for example. On spirituality, Confucius said to Chi Lu, one of his students: "You are not yet able to serve men, how can you serve spirits?" Attributes such as ancestor worship, ritual, and sacrifice were advocated by Confucius as necessary for social harmony; these attributes may be traced to the traditional Chinese folk religion.

Scholars recognise that classification ultimately depends on how one defines religion. Using stricter definitions of religion, Confucianism has been described as a moral science or philosophy. But using a broader definition, such as Frederick Streng's characterisation of religion as "a means of ultimate transformation," Confucianism could be described as a "sociopolitical doctrine having religious qualities." With the latter definition, Confucianism is religious, even if non-theistic, in the sense that it "performs some of the basic psycho-social functions of full-fledged religions."

See also

Notes

Citations

Bibliography

 .
 
 
 
 
 
 
 
 
  Volume I: The Ancient Eurasian World and the Celestial Pivot, Volume II: Representations and Identities of High Powers in Neolithic and Bronze China, Volume III: Terrestrial and Celestial Transformations in Zhou and Early-Imperial China.
 .
 
 .
 .
 
 .
 .
 .
 
 
 
 .
 
 .
 
 .
 .
 
 
 
 
Articles

Translations of texts attributed to Confucius

Analects (Lun Yu)
 Confucian Analects (1893) Translated by James Legge.
 The Analects of Confucius (1915; rpr. NY: Paragon, 1968). Translated by William Edward Soothill.
 The Analects of Confucius: A Philosophical Translation (New York: Ballantine, 1998). Translated by Roger T. Ames, Henry Rosemont.
 Confucius: The Analects (Lun yü) (London: Penguin, 1979; rpr. Hong Kong: Chinese University Press, 1992). Translated by D.C. Lau.
 The Analects of Confucius (Lun Yu) (Oxford: Oxford University Press, 1997). Translated by Chichung Huang.
 The Analects of Confucius (New York: W.W. Norton, 1997). Translated by Simon Leys.
 Analects: With Selections from Traditional Commentaries (Indianapolis: Hackett Publishing, 2003). Translated by Edward Slingerland.

External links

 
 
 Stanford Encyclopedia of Philosophy Entry: Confucius
 Interfaith Online: Confucianism
 Confucian Documents at the Internet Sacred Texts Archive.
 Oriental Philosophy, "Topic:Confucianism"

Institutional
 China Confucian Philosophy
 China Confucian Religion
 China Kongzi Network

 
Chinese philosophy
East Asian philosophy
East Asian religions
Eponymous political ideologies
Religious ethics
Religion in China